USS Sevier (APA-233) was a  in service with the United States Navy from 1944 to 1947. She was scrapped in 1980.

History
Sevier was named after counties in Arkansas, Tennessee, and Utah. She was laid down on 4 October 1944 under Maritime Commission contract (MC hull MCV 679) by Kaiser Shipbuilding of Vancouver, Washington; launched on 16 November 1944, and commissioned on 5 December 1944.

World War II
Sevier departed Seattle, Washington, on 20 December for San Pedro, California, where she underwent shakedown from 27 December 1944 to 26 January 1945. Sailing from Los Angeles on 6 February, she underwent a week of training near Pearl Harbor, and then continued westward to Eniwetok, where on 28 February, she joined a convoy bound for Iwo Jima.

Invasion of Iwo Jima
Departing Iwo Jima on 20 March, she disembarked the marines at Maui, T. H., on 5 April; and then underwent repairs to her main thrust bearing from 6 to 30 April at Pearl Harbor.

Embarking 1,193 officers and men of the 125th Construction Battalion and 171 marines, Sevier left Pearl on 12 May with a convoy, which, after a brief stop at Eniwetok, arrived at Ulithi on 26 May.

Invasion of Okinawa
Sevier was held at Eniwetok until 13 June; and then ordered to Okinawa, where she arrived on 17 June. During her two days and nights anchored off Okinawa, Sevier worked continuously unloading the Seabees and marines and their equipment. Underway on 19 June, she witnessed the intensive air and sea bombardment of the southern end of the island, before setting course for the United States.

Sevier arrived at San Francisco on 13 July and then proceeded to the Everett Pacific Shipyard near Seattle for repairs to her propeller shaft. Sevier returned to San Francisco on 27 July, sailed for Pearl Harbor on 1 August, and arrived there on 7 August.

Post-war
Sevier joined in the celebration of VJ-Day at Pearl Harbor and, on 26–27 August, embarked troops at Hilo Harbor for the occupation of Japan. Sailing from Pearl on 1 September, she stopped at Saipan from 13 to 16 September and entered Sasebo, Japan, on 22 September where she unloaded her troops and supplies.

Underway three days later, she arrived at Manila on 30 September and then embarked more occupation troops in Lingayen Gulf from 3 to 6 October. Underway on 9 October, the transport arrived at Sasebo on 14 October and disembarked her troops between 20 and 22 October.

Assigned next to Operation Magic Carpet, Sevier sailed from Sasebo on 23 October; and, on 27 and 28 October, embarked servicemen at Saipan for the trip home to the United States. She disembarked them at San Francisco on 10 November, and, after moving to Bremerton, Washington, sailed from there on 24 November to bring home troops from Guam and Manus. Returning to Seattle on 29 December, Sevier remained inactive at Port Angeles from 31 December 1945 to 6 March 1946, when she was assigned further duties supporting occupation troops in the western Pacific.

After a voyage to Pearl Harbor and back, Sevier sailed from San Francisco on 16 April for Yokosuka where she arrived on 29 April. Sailing again on 3 May, she touched at Midway on 9 May; and then arrived at Pearl on 13 May. There, she was assigned the duty of evacuating personnel from Bikini in preparation for the atomic bomb tests.

Departing Pearl on 28 May, she was at Kwajalein and Bikini from 3 to 8 June before sailing for San Francisco, where she arrived on 18 June. She remained on the west coast until sailing on 7 September 1946 from San Diego for Yokosuka, where she arrived on 23 September.

The transport departed Yokosuka on 26 October and spent the next three months at anchor in Chinese ports: at Tsingtao from 29 October 1946 to 15 January 1947 and at Chinwangtao from 16 to 22 January. Sailing for home, she stopped at Guam from 27 to 31 January and at Pearl Harbor from 8 to 13 February before arriving at San Francisco on 18 February to prepare for deactivation.

Decommissioning and fate
Sevier was decommissioned at Suisun Bay, California, on 30 April 1947 and delivered to the Maritime Commission's National Defense Reserve Fleet there on the same day. She was struck from the Navy List on 23 June 1947. On 1 January 1969, she was redesignated LPA-233. She was sold for scrapping on 15 February 1980.

Decorations
Sevier received two battle stars for her World War II service.

References

External links

APA/LPA-233 Sevier, Navsource Online.

 

Haskell-class attack transports
Sevier County, Arkansas
Sevier County, Tennessee
Sevier County, Utah
World War II amphibious warfare vessels of the United States
Ships built in Vancouver, Washington
1944 ships